In mathematics, Fredholm solvability encompasses results and techniques for solving differential and integral equations via the Fredholm alternative and, more generally, the Fredholm-type properties of the operator involved. The concept is named after Erik Ivar Fredholm.

Let  be a real -matrix and  a vector.

The Fredholm alternative in  states that the equation  has a solution if and only if  for every vector  satisfying . This alternative has many applications, for example, in bifurcation theory. It can be generalized to abstract spaces. So, let  and  be Banach spaces and let  be a continuous linear operator. Define

 

An equation  is said to be normally solvable (in the sense of F. Hausdorff) if it has a solution whenever .

In non-linear analysis, this latter result is used as definition of normal solvability for non-linear operators.

References

 F. Hausdorff, "Zur Theorie der linearen metrischen Räume" Journal für die Reine und Angewandte Mathematik, 167 (1932) pp. 265  
 V. A. Kozlov, V.G. Maz'ya, J. Rossmann, "Elliptic boundary value problems in domains with point singularities", Amer. Math. Soc. (1997)  
 A. T. Prilepko, D.G. Orlovsky, I.A. Vasin, "Methods for solving inverse problems in mathematical physics", M. Dekker (2000) 
 D. G. Orlovskij, "The Fredholm solvability of inverse problems for abstract differential equations" A.N. Tikhonov (ed.) et al. (ed.), Ill-Posed Problems in the Natural Sciences, VSP (1992) 

Fredholm theory